There are 159 species of non-marine molluscs living in the wild in Latvia. In addition there are at least 9 gastropod species living only in as hothouse aliens in greenhouses, aquaria and terraria.

There are 129 species of gastropods, 43 species of freshwater gastropods, 86 species of land gastropods and 30 species of bivalves living in the wild.

Summary table of number of species
(Summary table is based on species counted in this list and include also those ones with question marks)

Systematic list
The list is divided into freshwater and land species and then arranged in zoological order. The list is complete.

Freshwater gastropods 
Species of non-marine gastropods in Latvia include:

Neritidae
 Theodoxus fluviatilis (Linnaeus, 1758)

Viviparidae
 Viviparus viviparus (Millet, 1813)
 Viviparus contectus (Linnaeus, 1758)

Hydrobiidae
 Hydrobia ulvae (Pennant, 1777)
 Hydrobia stagnalis (Baster, 1765)
 Potamopyrgus antipodarum (Gray, 1843)
 Marstoniopsis scholtzi  (A. Schmidt, 1856)

Lithoglyphidae
 Lithoglyphus naticoides C. Pfeiffer, 1828

Bithyniidae
 Bithynia tentaculata (Linnaeus, 1758)
 Bithynia leachii (Sheppard, 1823)

Valvatidae
 Valvata cristata O. F. Müller, 1774
 Valvata pulchella Studer, 1820
 Valvata piscinalis (O. F. Müller, 1774)

Acroloxidae
 Acroloxus lacustris (Linnaeus, 1758)

Lymnaeidae
 Galba truncatula (O. F. Müller, 1774)
 Stagnicola palustris (O. F. Müller, 1774)
 Stagnicola fuscus (C. Pfeiffer, 1821)
 Stagnicola corvus (Gmelin, 1791)
 Radix auricularia (Linnaeus, 1758)
 Radix ampla (Hartmann, 1821)
 Radix peregra (O. F. Müller, 1774)
 Radix balthica (Linnaeus, 1758)
 Myxas glutinosa (O. F. Müller, 1774)
 Lymnaea stagnalis (Linnaeus, 1758)

Physidae
 Aplexa hypnorum (Linnaeus, 1758)
 Physa fontinalis (Linnaeus, 1758)

Planorbidae
 Planorbarius corneus (Linnaeus, 1758)
 Planorbis planorbis (Linnaeus, 1758)
 Planorbis carinatus O. F. Müller, 1774
 Anisus spirorbis (Linnaeus, 1758)
 Anisus leucostoma (Millet, 1813)
 Anisus vortex (Linnaeus, 1758)
 Anisus vorticulus (Troschel, 1834)
 Bathyomphalus contortus (Linnaeus, 1758)
 Gyraulus albus (O. F. Müller, 1774)
 Gyraulus acronicus (A. Fėrussak, 1807)
 Gyraulus laevis (Alder, 1838)
 Gyraulus riparius (Westerlund, 1865)
 Gyraulus rossmaessleri (Auerswald, 1851)
 Gyraulus crista (Linnaeus, 1758)
 Hippeutis complanatus (Linnaeus, 1758)
 Segmentina nitida (O. F. Müller, 1774)
 Ancylus fluviatilis O. F. Müller, 1774

Land gastropods 

Aciculidae
 Platyla polita (Hartmann, 1840)

Ellobiidae
 Carychium minimum (O. F. Müller, 1774)
 Carychium tridentatum (Risso, 1826)

Cochlicopidae
 Cochlicopa lubrica (O. F. Müller, 1774)
 Cochlicopa lubricella (Porro, 1838)
 Cochlicopa nitens (Gallenstein, 1848)

Lauriidae
 Lauria cylindracea (Da Costa, 1778)

Pupillidae
 Pupilla muscorum (Linnaeus, 1758)

Valloniidae
 Vallonia costata (O. F. Müller, 1774)
 Vallonia pulchella (O. F. Müller, 1774)
 Vallonia excentrica Sterki, 1893
 Acanthinula aculeata (O. F. Müller, 1774)
 Spermodea lamellata (Jeffreys, 1830)

Vertiginidae
 Columella edentula (Draparnaud, 1805)
 Columella aspera Waldėn, 1966
 Truncatellina cylindrica (A. Ferussac, 1807)
 Vertigo pusilla O. F. Müller, 1774
 Vertigo antivertigo (Draparnaud, 1801)
 Vertigo substriata (Jeffreys, 1833)
 Vertigo pygmaea (Draparnaud, 1801)
 Vertigo lilljeborgi (Westerlund, 1871)
 Vertigo genesii (Gredler, 1856)
 Vertigo geyeri Lindholm, 1925
 Vertigo ronnebyensis (Westerlund, 1871)
 Vertigo alpestris Alder, 1838
 Vertigo angustior Jeffreys, 1830

Enidae
 Ena montana (Draparnaud, 1801)
 Merdigera obscura (O. F. Müller, 1774)

Clausiliidae
 Cochlodina laminata (Montagu, 1803)
 Cochlodina orthostoma (Menke, 1828)
 Ruthenica filograna (Rossmässler, 1836)
 Macrogastra ventricosa (Draparnaud, 1801)
 Macrogastra plicatula (Draparnaud, 1801)
 Macrogastra borealis (Boettger, 1878) - synonym: Macrogastra latestriata (A. Schmidt, 1857)
 Clausilia bidentata (Ström, 1765)
 Clausilia cruciata (Studer, 1820)
 Clausilia pumila C. Pfeiffer, 1828
 Clausilia dubia Draparnaud, 1805
 Laciniaria plicata (Draparnaud, 1801)
 Balea biplicata (Montagu, 1803)
 Bulgarica cana (Held, 1836)

Succineidae
 Succinea putris (Linnaeus, 1758)
 Succinella oblonga (Draparnaud, 1801)
 Oxyloma elegans (Risso, 1826)

Ferussaciidae
 Cecilioides acicula (O. F. Müller, 1774) - nonindigenous since 2006

Punctidae
 Punctum pygmaeum (Draparnaud, 1801)

Discidae
 Discus ruderatus (A. Ferussac, 1821)
 Discus rotundatus (O. F. Müller, 1774)

Gastrodontidae
 Zonitoides nitidus (O. F. Müller, 1774)

Euconulidae
 Euconulus fulvus (O. F. Müller, 1774)
 Euconulus alderi (Gray, 1840)

Vitrinidae
 Vitrina pellucida (O. F. Müller, 1774)

Zonitidae
 Vitrea crystallina (O. F. Müller, 1774)
 Vitrea contracta (Westerlund, 1871)

Oxychilidae
 Aegopinella pura (Alder, 1830)
 Aegopinella nitidula (Draparnaud, 1805)
 Perpolita hammonis (Strøm, 1765)
 Perpolita petronella (L. Pfeiffer, 1853)
 Oxychilus cellarius (O. F. Müller, 1774)
 Oxychilus draparnaudi (Beck, 1837)
 Oxychilus alliarius (Miller, 1822)

Limacidae
 Limax cinereoniger Wolf, 1803
 Limax maximus Linnaeus, 1758
 Limacus flavus (Linnaeus, 1758)
 Malacolimax tenellus (O. F. Müller, 1774)
 Lehmannia marginata (O. F. Müller, 1774)

Agriolimacidae
 Deroceras laeve (O. F. Müller, 1774)
 ? Deroceras agreste Linnaeus, 1758 - marked with question mark in reference
 Deroceras reticulatum (O. F. Müller, 1774)

Arionidae
 Arion subfuscus (Draparnaud, 1805)
 Arion circumscriptus Johnston, 1828
 Arion fasciatus (Nilsson, 1823)
 Arion silvaticus Lohmander, 1937
 ? Arion distinctus Mabille, 1868 - marked with question mark in reference
 ? Arion hortensis A. Fėrussac, 1819 - marked with question mark in reference

Bradybaenidae
 Fruticicola fruticum (O. F. Müller, 1774)

Hygromiidae
 Euomphalia strigella (Draparnaud, 1801)
 Trichia hispida (Linnaeus, 1758)
 Xerolenta obvia (Menke, 1828)
 Pseudotrichia rubiginosa (Rossmässler, 1838)

Helicidae
 Arianta arbustorum (Linnaeus, 1758)
 Helicigona lapicida (Linnaeus, 1758)
 Isognomostoma isognomostomos (Schröter, 1784)
 Cepaea hortensis (O. F. Müller, 1774)
 Cepaea nemoralis (Linnaeus, 1758)
 Helix pomatia Linnaeus, 1758

Bivalvia
Species of freshwater bivalves in Latvia include:

 Unionoida
 Margaritiferidae
 Margaritifera margaritifera (Linnaeus, 1758)

 Unionidae
 Unio pictorum (Linnaeus, 1758)
 Unio tumidus Philipsson, 1788
 Unio crassus Philipsson, 1788
 Anodonta anatina (O. F. Müller, 1774)
 Anodonta cygnea (Linnaeus, 1758)
 Pseudanodonta complanata (Rossmässler, 1835)

 Veneroida
 Sphaeriidae
 Sphaerium corneum (Linnaeus, 1758)
 Sphaerium nucleus (S. Studer, 1820)
 Sphaerium ovale (A. Férussac, 1807)
 Sphaerium rivicola (Lamarck, 1818)
 Sphaerium solidum (Normand, 1844)
 Musculium lacustre (O. F. Müller, 1774)
 Pisidium amnicum (O. F. Müller, 1774)
 Pisidium casertanum (Poli, 1791)
 Pisidium henslowanum (Sheppard, 1823)
 Pisidium hibernicum Westerlund, 1894
 Pisidium lilljeborgii Clessin, 1886
 Pisidium milium Held, 1836
 Pisidium nitidum Jenyns, 1832
 Pisidium obtusale (Lamarck, 1818)
 Pisidium personatum Malm, 1855
 Pisidium pulchellum Jenyns, 1832
 Pisidium subtruncatum Malm, 1855
 Pisidium supinum A. Schmidt, 1851

 Dreissenidae
 Dreissena polymorpha (Pallas, 1771)

Hothouse aliens 
"Hothouse aliens" in Latvia include:
 Pomacea bridgesii
 Marisa cornuarietis
 Melanoides tuberculata
 Pseudosuccinea columella
 Physella acuta
 Helisoma trivolvis
 Achatina fulica
 Archachatina marginata
 Arion ater

See also
Lists of molluscs of surrounding countries:
 List of non-marine molluscs of Sweden

References

Moll
Latvia
Latvia
Latvia